Cloy Mitchell Mattox (November 24, 1902 – August 3, 1985) nicknamed "Monk", was an American Major League Baseball catcher. He played for the Philadelphia Athletics during the  season. He played college football with Frank Peake as part of the Pony Express backfield of Virginia Tech.

References

Major League Baseball catchers
Philadelphia Athletics players
Virginia Tech Hokies baseball players
Baseball players from Virginia
Virginia Tech Hokies football players
1902 births
1985 deaths
People from Campbell County, Virginia